Richard Odada (born November 25, 2000) is a Kenyan professional footballer who plays as a midfielder for the Philadelphia Union of Major League Soccer and the Kenya national team.

Club career

Early career
Odada played with Lasier Hill Academy as a youth player before joining Kenyan Premier League club Leopards in July 2018. While he made the first team game day roster 11 times in the 2018–19 season, he made no appearances. Later that year, his performances earned him training and trial stints in Serbia with Red Star Belgrade and Voždovac, in Switzerland, and in Italy with Juventus and Inter Milan.

Red Star Belgrade
On 30 January 2019 after a successful trial, Odada joined Serbian SuperLiga club Red Star Belgrade. He was initially assigned to the club's under-19 side. To later get playing time at the senior level, Odada was initially loaned to Grafičar Beograd, an affiliate club of Red Star often used for development of its younger players.

On 30 January 2020, Odada was sent on loan to Serbian First League club Grafičar Beograd. He made his debut on 29 February 2020 in a 3–0 victory against Radnički Pirot, where he played all 90 minutes. In the 2019–20 season, he played 7 matches, recording one assist in a 5–0 victory over Sinđelić Beograd on 20 June 2020. In the 2020–21 season, while remaining on loan with Grafičar Beograd through January 2021, Odada played 14 matches in the First League, during which he recorded an assist against Radnički Pirot on 30 August 2020. He also played one game in the Serbian Cup against Voždovac.

Odada returned to Red Star in January 2021, and remained there through the end of the 2020–21 season. He made his SuperLiga debut as a substitute on 28 February 2021 in a 4–0 victory over Proleter Novi Sad. On 2 March 2021, he also made a substitute appearance in a 4–1 victory over Mladost Lučani.

During the 2021–22 season, Odada was loaned to Metalac Gornji Milanovac in the SuperLiga. He made his debut as a starter on 19 July 2021 in a 0–0 draw against Radnik Surdulica. He went on to play 27 games, including 17 starts, during the season, in addition to one game in the Serbian Cup. After the conclusion of his loan to Metalac Gornji Milanovac, Red Star had planned to loan Odada again to Grafičar Beograd for the 2022–23 season, with his contract set to expire on 31 December 2022. Instead of starting the season with a return to Grafičar Beograd, Odada switched player agencies on 9 July 2022 to help explore transfer opportunities.

Philadelphia Union 
On August 8, 2022, Odada joined Philadelphia Union in a transfer from Red Star on 2.5 years contract, with an optional 2 years. He will occupy an international roster slot.

International career

Youth 
On 17 January 2016, Odada was called into a provisional under-17 camp for Inter Government Agency Development games in advance of qualifiers for the 2017 Africa U-17 Cup of Nations.

On 1 April 2018, Odada scored the lone goal in his debut for the Kenya under-20 national team in a 2019 Africa U-20 Cup of Nations first round qualifier match against Rwanda that ended in a 1–1 draw. He also served as the team captain. Odada was a substitute in the return leg in Rwanda, a 0-0 tie which eliminated Kenya on the away goals rule.

Senior 
Odada made his debut for the Kenya national football team on 2 September 2021 in a World Cup qualifier against Uganda. He started and played the full match in a 0–0 home draw. His national team coach, Jacob Mulee, praised Odada's debut, saying "we have had different players coming in, and new players who were making their debut. I was impressed with Odada, meaning he has solved our problem in the midfield department. He is just 20 and has a lot to offer.". His performance neutralizing the Uganda attack and replacing Victor Wanyama as Kenya's defensive midfielder also earned him accolades in the press. Odada also played World Cup qualifiers against Rwanda (a 1–1 away tie) and Mali (a 5-0 away loss and 1-0 home loss). In his 5th international game, Odada scored his first national team goal, a game-winning penalty kick, for Kenya in its November 15, 2021 World Cup qualifier 2-1 win over Rwanda.

Career statistics

Club

Honours
Red Star Belgrade
 Serbian SuperLiga: 2020–21

References

External links

2000 births
Living people
Kenyan footballers
Kenya international footballers
Kenyan expatriate footballers
Association football midfielders
A.F.C. Leopards players
RFK Grafičar Beograd players
Red Star Belgrade footballers
Philadelphia Union players
Serbian First League players
Serbian SuperLiga players
Footballers from Nairobi
Kenyan expatriate sportspeople in the United States
Expatriate soccer players in the United States
Philadelphia Union II players
MLS Next Pro players